Hatendi is a Zimbabwean surname. Notable people with the surname include:

David Hatendi (1953–2012), Zimbabwean businessman, entrepreneur, and banker
Nyasha Hatendi (born 1981), American-English actor and producer
Peter Hatendi (1927–2018), Zimbabwean bishop 

Surnames of African origin